Guy of Ibelin may refer to:
Guy of Ibelin, constable of Cyprus (c. 1215–1255), marshal and constable of Cyprus, son of John of Ibelin, old Lord of Beirut
Guy of Ibelin (died 1304), count of Jaffa, son of John of Jaffa, the jurist
Guy of Ibelin (1286–1308)
 Guy of Ibelin, seneschal of Cyprus, (b. before 1306 d. 1350/1360), burgher of Venice
 Guy of Ibelin, bishop of Limassol, (died 1367)